Maierhofer is a surname. Notable people with the surname include:

 Franz Maierhofer (born 1897), German Nazi Party Gauleiter
 Matthias Maierhofer (born 1979), Austrian musician
 Monika Maierhofer (born 1967), Austrian alpine skier
 Rico Maierhofer (born 1987), Filipino basketball player
 Ron Maierhofer (born 1957), American soccer player
 Sophie Maierhofer (born 1996), Austrian footballer
 Stefan Maierhofer (born 1982), Austrian footballer
  (born 1985), Liechtensteiner association football player

German-language surnames